1st Central Committee may refer to:
Central Committee of the 1st Congress of the Russian Social Democratic Labour Party, 1898–1903
1st Central Committee of the Bulgarian Communist Party, 1919–1920
1st Central Executive Committee of the Chinese Communist Party, 1921–1922
1st Central Committee of the Communist Party of Cuba, 1975–1980
1st Central Committee of the Socialist Unity Party of Germany, 1946–1947
1st Central Committee of the Polish United Workers' Party, 1948–1954
1st Central Committee of the Romanian Communist Party, 1921–1922
1st Central Committee of the Lao People's Revolutionary Party, 1955–1972
1st Central Committee of the Indochinese Communist Party, 1935–1951
1st Central Committee of the Communist Party of Yugoslavia, 1919–1920
1st Central Committee of the Party of Communists in Hungary, 1919–1930
1st Central Committee of the Workers' Party of North Korea, 1946–1948
1st Central Committee of the Workers' Party of South Korea, 1946–1949